Inga Lantz (1 February 1943– 28 July 2017) was a Swedish politician. She served on the Riksdag from 1973 to 1988 as a member of the Left Party–Communists.

References

Further reading  
  

1943 births
2017 deaths
Women members of the Riksdag
Members of the Riksdag from the Left Party (Sweden)
Members of the Riksdag 1970–1973
Members of the Riksdag 1974–1976
Members of the Riksdag 1976–1979
Members of the Riksdag 1979–1982
Members of the Riksdag 1982–1985
Members of the Riksdag 1985–1988